"You're Gonna Lose Us" is a non-album single from The Cribs, and was released on 5 December 2005, charting at #30 on the UK Singles Chart.

The track originally appeared as a b-side to "Hey Scenesters!" earlier in the year, before being reworked by Bernard Butler for its own stand-alone release.

Music video
The promotional video recreates the infamous early '90s television programme The Word, featuring an appearance from its original host Terry Christian.

External links
Official website
The Cribs' official MySpace
Record label website

2005 singles
The Cribs songs
Songs written by Gary Jarman
Songs written by Ross Jarman
Songs written by Ryan Jarman
2005 songs